Olympus-1 was a communications satellite built by Astrium (at the time of the construction of the satellite British Aerospace and Matra Marconi Space) and Thales Alenia Space (also at the time Alcatel Espace and Alenia Spazio), along with Fokker and SPAR Aerospace (now both known as Airbus Defence and Space Netherlands and MDA), for the European Space Agency. At the time of its launch on 12 July 1989, it was the largest civilian telecommunications satellite ever built, and sometimes known as "LargeSat" or "L-Sat". The satellite had a series of unfortunate accidents in orbit and went out of service on 11/12 August 1993. The first accident was the loss of ability to articulate the satellite's solar arrays. This was later followed by the loss of an on-board gyro during the height of the Perseid meteor shower. The satellite spun out of control and efforts to stabilise it resulted in the expenditure of the majority of its fuel. Subsequently, it was moved to a GEO disposal orbit and was put out of commission. The same manufacturers made the Alphabus satellite bus, using lessons learned from the Eurostar and Spacebus programs, and acting very much in the same way as Olympus. However, only one was constructed for Inmarsat (Inmarsat-4A F4).

References

External links
 "The sad story of Olympus 1"
 "The Olympus failure", ESA press release, 26 August 1993
 "OLYMPUS", NASA Satellite Communications Systems and Technology, July 1993

Communications satellites
Derelict satellites orbiting Earth
European Space Agency satellites